Ferrett Steinmetz is the pen name of author William Steinmetz, who writes science fiction and urban fantasy and has been active since 2004.

Biography
Steinmetz lives in Cleveland with his wife and dog.

Literary career
While writing since about 1988, Steinmetz's literary career was "rebooted" by attending the 2008 Clarion Workshop, which "transformed [it] into something with intense focus ... and the ability to scale previously impossible publishing walls."  

His work has appeared in various periodicals, webzines, podcasts and anthologies, including Andromeda Spaceways Inflight Magazine, Apex Magazine, Asimov's Science Fiction, Bards and Sages Quarterly, Beneath Ceaseless Skies, Daily Science Fiction, The Drabblecast, Dragons, Droids & Dooms: Year One, The Edge of Propinquity, Electric Spec, Escape Pod, Fantasy Scroll Magazine, Giganotosaurus, GUD, Kaleidotrope, Leading Edge, Lullaby Hearse, Nebula Awards Showcase 2013, Orson Scott Card's InterGalactic Medicine Show, PodCastle, Pseudopod, Redstone Science Fiction, Rocket Dragons Ignite, Shimmer, Soundproff Digest, Space and Time, Three-lobed Burning Eye, Three-lobed Burning Eye Annual, Uncanny Magazine, Unidentified Funny Objects, Upside Down: Inverted Tropes in Storytelling, What Fates Impose, and Whispers From the Abyss Vol. 2.

His recent novel Sol Majestic was reviewed in The Wall Street Journal as an example of the sub-genre "hopepunk".

Awards
Steinmetz's story “Sauerkraut Station” (Giganotosaurus, Nov. 2011) was nominated for the 2011 Nebula Award for best novelette.

2008 Penguicon controversy
During the Penguicon convention in 2008, Steinmetz and a small group of other attendees partook in The Open Source Boob Project, where they would touch the breasts of consenting female convention attendees. According to Steinmetz, this was not sanctioned by the convention, largely went unnoticed by the majority of attendees, and was a positive experience for those participating. After the convention, controversy about the project developed online after Steinmetz posted about it and initially encouraged other people to repeat the project at other conventions, before later issuing an apology and retraction in light of the controversy.

Bibliography

'Mancer trilogy
Flex (Angry Robot, 2015)
The Flux (Angry Robot, 2015)
Fix (Angry Robot, 2016)

Other novels
The Uploaded (Angry Robot, 2017)
The Sol Majestic (Tor Books, 2019)
Automatic Reload (Tor Books, 2020)

Short fiction

"More Than Human" (2004)
"Listen" (2006) (as William Steinmetz)
"The Sound of Gears" (2009)
"Camera Obscured" (2009)
"At the Unicorn Factory" (2009)
"Suicide Notes, Written by an Alien Mind" (2009)
"In the Land of the Deaf" (2009)
"The Elderly Cyborg" (2009)
"The Backdated Romance" (2010)
"Home Despot" (2010)
"In the Garden of Rust and Salt" (2010)
"Under the Thumb of the Brain Patrol" (2010)
"As Below, So Above" (2010)
"Dead Prophecies" (2011)
"A Window, Clear as a Mirror" (2011)
"My Father's Wounds" (2011)
"iTime" (2011)
"Sauerkraut Station" (2011)
"'Run,' Bakri Says" (2011)
"Devour" (2012)
"In the Unlikely Event" (2012)
"Dead Merchandise" (2012)
"Riding Atlas" (2012)
"One-Hand Tantra" (2012)
"Shoebox Heaven" (2013)
"Shadow Transit" (2013)
"Hollow as the World" (2013)
"Black Swan Oracle" (2013)
"The Sturdy Bookshelves of Pawel Oliszewski" (2013)
"In Extremis" (2014)
"The Bliss Machine" (2014)
"The Cultist's Son" (2014)
"Four Scenes from Wieczniak's Whisk-U-Away, and One Not" (2014)
"Flex" (excerpt) (2015)
"The Flux" (excerpt) (2015)
"Rooms Formed of Neurons and Sex" (2016)
"The Tangled Web" (2016)
"Madness Is a Skill" (2019)

References

External links
 
 

Living people
21st-century American male writers
American speculative fiction writers
Year of birth missing (living people)